Marius Hügli (born 21 April 1993), known professionally as Marius Bear, is a Swiss singer. He represented  in the Eurovision Song Contest 2022 in Turin, Italy, with the song "Boys Do Cry". He studied to be a construction mechanic and has been active as a musician for six years. He is originally from Appenzell. He began his career as a street musician in his native Switzerland, as well as in Germany. In 2019 he won a Swiss Music Award in the category "Best Talent".

Discography

Albums

EPs

Charted singles

Filmography
I Can See Your Voice (season 1, 2020) – Mystery singer

Awards and nominations

Results

References

Swiss male singers
Swiss people of Australian descent
Living people
1993 births
Eurovision Song Contest entrants of 2022
Eurovision Song Contest entrants for Switzerland